Mahira Ali Mohmed Ali El Danbouki (born 1 November 1997) is an Egyptian footballer who plays for Wadi Degla SC in the Egyptian Women's Premier League. She has been a member of the Egypt women's national team.

Club career
In 2018 she joined the Oakville Blue Devils in League1 Ontario. She scored her first goal in her debut on June 10, 2018, against West Ottawa SC. On July 21, she scored five goals in an 11–0 victory over Darby FC. On August 11, she scored four goals in a 6–1 victory over Aurora FC. In 2018, she won the award for Goal of the Year and was named a league First Team All-Star. She scored 16 goals in just 8 games during her first season with the Blue Devils. On May 31, 2019, she scored a hat trick against North Mississauga SC, and four goals on June 23 against DeRo United FC. She was again named a league First Team All-Star in 2019, after scoring 18 goals in 13 league games (adding 1 goal in five playoff matches). She won the league title with Oakville in 2019 becoming one of the first Egyptian women, along with teammate Rana Hamdy to win a domestic league title.

In 2019/20, she played with AIMZ Egypt, winning the Best Player in the Egyptian Women's Premier League award.

In 2021, she won the inaugural Egyptian Women's Cup with El Gouna.

In August 2022, she signed with Wadi Degla SC. She helped the side qualify for the 2022 CAF Women's Champions League, recording two assists (one in each match) in the qualifying tournament.

International career
Ali has represented Egypt at the U16, U17, and U18 levels.

Ali represents the Egypt women's national team since 2016. She scored in March 2016 against Libya.

International goals

References

External links
 

1997 births
Living people
Egyptian women's footballers
Egypt women's international footballers
Egyptian Muslims
Blue Devils FC (women) players
League1 Ontario (women) players
Women's association footballers not categorized by position
Wadi Degla SC players